The Michael Jackson: 30th Anniversary Celebration was a 2001 concert show and television special by Michael Jackson. It was staged in Madison Square Garden in New York City on September 7 and 10, 2001. In late November 2001, the CBS television network aired the concerts as a two-hour special in honor of Jackson's thirtieth year as a solo entertainer (his first solo single, "Got to Be There", was recorded in 1971). The show was edited from footage of the two performances. The show was watched by 30 million viewers on CBS when it aired later the same year.

The shows sold out in 2 hours. Ticket prices were among the most expensive ever for an event; the best seats cost $10,000 and included a dinner with Jackson and a signed poster. The show was choreographed by Glenn Douglas Packard and Brian Thomas, who were nominated for an Emmy Award for Outstanding Choreography. It was presented by David Gest, World Events LLC, and Clear Channel Entertainment. Jackson reportedly earned $7.5 million for each of the two concerts. The concert's official box-office taking was $10,072,105 for both concerts.

To some fans, Jackson appeared more disoriented in the first concert, as he only did one short moonwalk and improvised the ending of the "Billie Jean" performance. In 2011, presenter David Gest claimed that Jackson was on drugs during the concerts in the documentary Michael Jackson: The Life of an Icon; however, Jackson himself explained that he merely had not rehearsed for the first concert. Contradictorily, in his book You Are Not Alone: Michael Through a Brother's Eyes, brother Jermaine Jackson said that during this time Michael was taking Demerol, a pain-relieving medicine with psychotropic effects. The show attracted numerous celebrities, including basketball players, actors, and other musicians. The two concerts were the only times Jackson performed any song from his album Invincible live.

Setlists

Friday, September 7

Monday, September 10

Concert dates

Preparation dates

Aftermath
On September 11, 2001, Jackson, along with his personal assistant, Frank Cascio, were scheduled for a meeting at the World Trade Center, to return a "two million" dollar watch Jackson used for the concert, and a diamond necklace for Elizabeth Taylor, but overslept and did not make it. In the aftermath of the attacks, Jackson sponsored a charity concert titled United We Stand: What More Can I Give. The concerts were held in Washington, D.C. Other featured artists that also performed in the benefit concert were the Backstreet Boys, Slash,  Krystal Harris, Huey Lewis and the News, James Brown, Jennifer Lopez, Billy Gilman, O-Town, Usher, Christina Milian, Carole King, Al Green, Christina Aguilera, Pink, Bette Midler, CeCe Peniston, Aerosmith, America, P. Diddy, NSYNC, Destiny's Child, Rod Stewart, Goo Goo Dolls, Train, Britney Spears, Mariah Carey, and Mary J. Blige. In addition, his sister Janet Jackson performed with him.

This event also marked Randy Jackson's final concert with his brothers. He would contribute backup vocals for Michael's posthumous 2009 song, "This is It", along with his brothers Jackie, Tito, and Jermaine, before announcing his retirement from entertainment. From 2012 to 2013, the remaining brothers (without Randy) reunited for the Unity Tour, which was held in North America, Europe, Asia, Africa, and Oceania.

Personnel

Lead performer
Vocals, dance and choreographer: Michael Jackson

Additional performers
Vocals: Marlon Jackson, Jermaine Jackson, Tito Jackson, Jackie Jackson, Randy Jackson and others

Band members
Musical director: Greg Phillinganes
Keyboards: Greg Phillinganes, Brad Buxer, Michael Boddicker, Michael Bearden and Randy Jackson
Drums: Jonathan Moffett
Percussion: Bashiri Johnson
Guitars: Slash, David Williams, Greg Moore and Tito Jackson
Bass: Alex Al, Thomas Barney and Jermaine Jackson

Music department
Music supervisor: Sam Harris 
Arrangements: Greg Phillinganes, Joey Melotti and Jonathan Barrick
Music mixer: Brad Buxer, Michael Durham Prince, Jim Caruana and Thomas Cadley
Music recordist: Kooster McAllister
Vocal director: Sam Harris

Choreographer
Choreographer and dancer: Glenn Douglas Packard
Choreographer and dancer Brian Thomas
Head Of Makeup Department Sajata Robinson imbd.html

References

Michael Jackson concerts
2001 concerts
2000s American television specials
2001 in American music
2001 in American television
2001 television specials
2001 in New York City
CBS television specials
Madison Square Garden
Music television specials